Lukman Olanrewaju Odunaike (born 17 April 1998), better known by his stage name Not3s (pronounced Notes), is a British singer-songwriter, rapper and actor from Hackney, London. His songs include "My Lover" and "Fine Line", both of which are collaborations with Mabel.

His breakthrough song, "Addison Lee", has been described as a viral hit, achieving 16 million views on GRM Daily and has achieved much publicity for the singer. The song, which takes its name from the London-based ride sharing firm, achieved such popularity that Not3s was invited to the firm's Christmas party in KOKO to perform the song.

He was nominated for the BBC Sound of 2018.

Personal life
Odunaike was born and grew up in Hackney, London to Nigerian parents. He is a supporter of Manchester United F.C.

Discography

Studio albums

Mixtapes

Singles

As lead artist

As featured artist

Other charted songs

Guest appearances

Filmography

Television

Web

References

Black British male rappers
People from the London Borough of Hackney
1998 births
Living people
English people of Yoruba descent
Rappers from London
English people of Nigerian descent